Aeolian Hall may refer to:
Aeolian Hall (Manhattan), a concert hall near Times Square in Midtown Manhattan, New York City
Aeolian Hall (London), England
Aeolian Hall (London, Ontario), a historic music venue in London, Ontario

Architectural disambiguation pages